Lev Osipovich Belopolsky (4 July 1907 – 5 November 1990) was a Soviet ornithologist and marine biologist who founded the Biological Station of the Zoological Institute in Rybachiy. He worked extensively on polar ecology, especially in the Barents Sea and the Curonian Spit, and produced works on the biology of the birds of the region.

Belopolsky was born in St. Petersburg. He studied at the Moscow State University, graduating in 1930. He obtained a doctorate in 1945. He took part in oceanographic research aboard the icebreakers A. Sibiryakov (1932) and Chelyuskin (1933–1934); the latter expedition ended in disaster with the ship being crushed by ice and the rescue involved the survivors building a runway on ice for the rescue aircraft to land. The incident was famous in its time and used by Joseph Stalin for propaganda. Belopolsky was one of the survivors and he received high honours from the Soviet Union for his participation. In early 1950, Belopolsky's brother was held on trial for allegedly spying for England, and was shot dead. Both of Belopolsky's parents were arrested and sent to labour camps, and he too was sentenced for five years in Siberia in 1952. He had to return his awards, and it was only after Stalin's death that Belopolsky was released from prison camp. He was rehabilitated and joined the Zoological Institute at Leningrad. The director-professor Yevgeny Pavlovsky allowed him to continue his research in the Baltic.

In 1956, Belopolsky persuaded the Soviet authorities to reestablish the Rossitten Bird Observatory, and then became its director. He described the subspecies Parus atricapillus anadyrensis in 1932.

References

1907 births
1990 deaths
Moscow State University alumni
Recipients of the Order of the Red Banner of Labour
Recipients of the Order of the Red Star
Soviet ornithologists
Soviet marine biologists